This article lists events from the year 2017 in Angola.

Incumbents 
 President: José Eduardo dos Santos (until 26 September), João Lourenço (starting 26 September)
 Vice President: Manuel Vicente (until 26 September), Bornito de Sousa (starting 26 September)

Events

Deaths

References

Links

 
2010s in Angola
Years of the 21st century in Angola
Angola
Angola